Akköy Dam is a dam in Kayseri Province, Turkey, built between 1964 and 1967.

See also
List of dams and reservoirs in Turkey

External links
DSI

Dams in Kayseri Province
Dams completed in 1967